Typha minima, common name dwarf bulrush or miniature cattail or least bulrush, is a perennial herbaceous plant belonging to the Typhaceae family.

Description
The biological form of Typha minima is hemicryptophyte hydrophyte, meaning that they are plants with submerged overwintering buds, adapted to living in aquatic environments. Vegetative propagation takes place by means of a short 5 to 8 millimeters thick rhizome, that grow up to 20 cm deep in the ground.

Typha minima is the smallest of the cattails. The stem is erect and simple. The leaves are blue-green, linear, very narrow and not shiny.

 These plants are monoecious, with the male and female reproductive structures borne on the same plant but packed into two separate inflorescences. The minute flowers are unisexual and wind-pollinated. Male (staminate) flowers are yellowish, while female (pistillate) flowers are greenish. The male inflorescence is thinner and longer, at the top of the vertical stem. The female flowers have one  stalked ovary, surrounded by a thick fringe of hair. The three individual stamens of the male flowers are surrounded by just a few hairs. At the end of blooming the male flowers disperse, leaving the top of the stem naked, while the female inflorescence turns into a brown round seed spike. The main flowering period lasts from May through June. Another flowering period may occur in  August.

Distribution
This rare plant is widespread in temperate Europe and Asia. The distribution is limited to the rivers of the Alps and the Apennines and to the Balkans, the Danube region and the mountains of central Asia.

Habitat
Typha minima is a light-loving plant and cannot tolerate shade.

References

 Plant Finder

External links
 Biolib
 Schede di botanica

minima
Freshwater plants
Flora of Europe
Flora of Asia
Plants described in 1794